The United States of the Ionian Islands was a Greek state and amical protectorate of the United Kingdom between 1815 and 1864. The successor state of the Septinsular Republic, it covered the territory of the Ionian Islands, as well as the town of Parga on the adjacent mainland in modern Greece. It was ceded by the British to Greece as a gift to the newly enthroned King George I, apart from Parga, which was sold to Ali Pasha of Ioannina in 1819.

History
Before the French Revolutionary Wars, the Ionian Islands had been part of the Republic of Venice. When the 1797 Treaty of Campo Formio dissolved the Republic of Venice, they were annexed to the French Republic. Between 1798 and 1799, the French were driven out by a joint Russo-Ottoman force. The occupying forces founded the Septinsular Republic, which enjoyed relative independence under nominal Ottoman suzerainty and Russian control from 1800 until 1807.

The Ionian Islands were then occupied by the French after the treaty of Tilsit.  In 1809, Britain defeated the French fleet off Zakynthos island on 2 October, and captured Kefalonia, Kythira, and Zakynthos. The British proceeded to capture Lefkada in 1810. The island of Corfu remained occupied by the French until 1814.

Under the Treaty between Great Britain and [Austria, Prussia and] Russia, respecting the Ionian Islands (signed in Paris on 5 November 1815), as one of the treaties signed during the Peace of Paris (1815), Britain obtained a protectorate over the Ionian Islands, and under Article VIII of the treaty the Austrian Empire was granted the same trading privileges with the Islands as Britain. As agreed in Article IV of the treaty a "New Constitutional Charter for the State" was drawn up and was formalised with the ratification of the "Maitland constitution" on 26 August 1817, which created a federation of the seven islands, with Lieutenant-General Sir Thomas Maitland its first "Lord High Commissioner of the Ionian Islands".

A few years later Greek nationalist groups started to form. Although their energy in the early years was directed to supporting their fellow Greek revolutionaries in the revolution against the Ottoman Empire, they switched their focus to enosis with Greece following their independence. The Party of Radicals (Greek: Κόμμα των Ριζοσπαστών) founded in 1848 as a pro-enosis political party. In September 1848 there were skirmishes with the British garrison in Argostoli and Lixouri on Kefalonia, which led to a certain level relaxation in the enforcement of the protectorate's laws, and freedom of the press as well. The island's populace did not hide their growing demands for enosis, and newspapers on the islands frequently published articles criticising British policies in the protectorate. On 15 August in 1849, another rebellion broke out, which was quashed by Henry George Ward, who proceeded to temporarily impose martial law.

On 26 November 1850, the Radical MP John Detoratos Typaldos proposed in the Ionian parliament the resolution for the enosis of the Ionian Islands with Greece which was signed by Gerasimos Livadas, Nadalis Domeneginis, George Typaldos, Frangiskos Domeneginis, Ilias Zervos Iakovatos, Iosif Momferatos, Telemachus Paizis, Ioannis Typaldos, Aggelos Sigouros-Dessyllas, Christodoulos Tofanis. In 1862, the party split into two factions, the "United Radical Party" and the "Real Radical Party". During the period of British rule, William Ewart Gladstone visited the islands and recommended their reunion with Greece, to the chagrin of the British government.

On 29 March 1864, representatives of Great Britain, Greece, France, and Russia signed the Treaty of London, pledging the transfer of sovereignty to Greece upon ratification; this was meant to bolster the reign of the newly installed King George I of Greece.  Thus, on 28 May, by proclamation of the Lord High Commissioner, the Ionian Islands were united with Greece.

Languages
According to the second constitution of the Republic (1803), Greek was the primary official language, in contrast to the situation in the Septinsular Republic. Italian was still in use, though, mainly for official purposes since the Venetian Republic. The only island in which Italian (Venetian) had a wider spread was Cephalonia, where a great number of people had adopted Venetian Italian as their first language.

States

The United States of the Ionian Islands was a federation.  It included seven island states, each of which was allocated a number of seats in the parliament, the Ionian Senate:

Government

The British organised administration under the direction of a Lord High Commissioner, appointed by the British government. In total, ten men served in this capacity, including William Gladstone as a Lord High Commissioner Extraordinary (in office 1858–1859).

The Ionian Islands had a bicameral legislature, titled the "Parliament of the United States of the Ionian Islands" and composed of a Legislative Assembly and Senate.

The 1818 constitution also established a High Court of Appeal to be called the Supreme Council of Justice of the United States of the Ionian Islands, of which the president was to be known as the Chief Justice, who would rank in precedence immediately after the President of the Senate.

The successive Chief Justices were:
 John Kirkpatrick 1820–1835
 Sir James John Reid 1837–?
 Sir Charles Sargent 1860–?
 Sir Patrick MacChombaich de Colquhoun 1861–1864

See also
 List of Greek countries and regions
 List of Lord High Commissioners of the Ionian Islands
 Order of St Michael and St George, a British order of chivalry created in honour of the protectorate.

Footnotes

Further reading
 
 Hannell, David. "The Ionian Islands under the British Protectorate: social and economic problems." Journal of Modern Greek Studies 7.1 (1989): 105–132. online
 Hannell, David. "A Case of Bad Publicity: Britain and the Ionian Islands, 1848–51." European History Quarterly 17.2 (1987): 131–143.
 Knox, Bruce. "British policy and the Ionian Islands, 1847–1864: nationalism and imperial administration." English Historical Review 99.392 (1984): 503–529.
 
 Pagratis, Gerassimos D. "The Ionian Islands under British Protection (1815–1864)." in Anglo-Saxons in the Mediterranean. Commerce, Politics and Ideas (XVII–XX Centuries), (Malta, 2007) pp: 131–150. online
 Paschalidi, Maria. "Constructing Ionian identities: the Ionian Islands in British official discourses; 1815–1864" (PhD dissertation, UCL (University College London), 2010. online
 Schumacher, Leslie Rogne. "Greek Expectations: Britain and the Ionian Islands, 1815–64.” in Imperial Expectations and Realities: El Dorados, Utopias and Dystopias, edited by Andrekos Varnava, (Manchester University Press, 2015), pp. 47–65. [www.jstor.org/stable/j.ctt1wn0scs.8 online]

External links

 
 The Constitution in Italian
 

 
States and territories established in 1815
States and territories disestablished in 1864
History of modern Greece
Greece–United Kingdom relations
1815 establishments in the British Empire
1815 establishments in Europe
1864 disestablishments in Europe
Former British colonies and protectorates in Europe